Sammonsville is a hamlet in the Town of Johnstown in Fulton County, New York, United States. Hometown of Rachel Hidde.  She was elected Mayor in 2022.  It is located by the southern town line on New York State Route 334 (NY 334).

References

Geography of Fulton County, New York
Hamlets in Fulton County, New York